Augustus Stephen Vogt (August 14, 1861September 17, 1926) was a German Canadian organist, choral conductor, music educator, composer, and author.

Vogt was born on 14 August 1861 in Washington, Oxford County, Canada West, Province of Canada. His father, John George Vogt, was a German Roman Catholic who emigrated to Canada to avoid the German revolutions of 1848–1849. His mother was a Swiss Lutheran woman named Marianna Zingg, who immigrated to Canada with her parents in the 1830s. Vogt grew up in Elmira, Ontario. Vogt's father was a hotel-keeper and also built organs. Vogt was appointed organist at the local church and later studied in Hamilton. He was appointed organist of First Methodist Church in St Thomas, Ontario. From 1881 to 1884, he studied at the New England Conservatory of Music. From 1885 to 1888, he studied at the Leipzig Conservatory in Germany. In 1888, he returned to Canada and was organist-choirmaster of the Jarvis Street Baptist Church in Toronto, where he would stay until 1906. He taught at the Toronto College of Music and at the Toronto Conservatory of Music. He was a fellow of the Royal College of Organists. Among his notable pupils were W. H. Hewlett and Ernest Seitz.

In 1894, he founded the Toronto Mendelssohn Choir. In 1913, he was appointed musical director of the Toronto Conservatory of Music and resigned from the Mendelssohn Choir in 1917. He began suffering from heart problems in 1918, but continued with his career, which he found demanding. He died on 17 September 1926 of a heart attack while suffering from influenza.

References

External links
 

1861 births
1926 deaths
People from Oxford County, Ontario
New England Conservatory alumni
Academic staff of Toronto College of Music
Canadian music educators
Canadian composers
Canadian male composers
Canadian conductors (music)
Male conductors (music)
Canadian organists
Male organists
Canadian people of German descent
Canadian people of Swiss descent
Musicians from Toronto
People from Woolwich, Ontario